1832 election may refer to:
 1832 Newfoundland general election
 1832 United Kingdom general election
 1832 United States presidential election